Pumpkin, Powder, Scarlet & Green is the third album released by the 60's pop group The American Breed, released in the summer of 1968. This album was not as successful as their first two efforts, but the album did manage to have three modest hit singles: "Cool It (We're Not Alone)", "Ready, Willing and Able" (#84), and a cover version of The Troggs' "Anyway That You Want Me" (#88). Unfortunately, this album marked a beginning in decline of the group's popularity.

Track listing

Personnel

The American Breed
 Gary Loizzo - lead guitar, lead vocals
 Al Ciner - rhythm guitar, backing vocals
 Charles Colbert - bass, backing vocals
 Lee Graziano - drums, backing vocals, trumpet

Additional musicians
 Ralph Craig – trombone
 Bobby Lewis, Bobby Howell, Arthur Hoyle – trumpets
 Lenard Druss – saxophone

Technical
 Bill Traut, Skeet Bushor, Bob Keene – producers
 Eddie Higgins – arrangements
 Jerry DeClercq – engineer
 Christopher Whorf – art direction
 George Whitemen – photography, design

References

1968 albums
The American Breed albums